The Pacific Border province is a physiographic province of the Physiographic regions of the world physical geography system.

Description
The Pacific Border province encompasses most of the North American Pacific Coast, with the southern end at the start of the Lower California-Peninsular Ranges Province in Southern California. The Pacific Border province is in the larger Pacific Mountain System Division—Region. The region is prone to earthquakes, residing along the eastern edge of the Pacific Ring of Fire.

Sections
The Pacific Border province contains seven separate and smaller sections:
Puget Trough
Olympic Mountains
Oregon Coast Range
Klamath Mountains
California Trough
California Coast Ranges
Transverse Ranges (Los Angeles Ranges)

See also
 Cascade-Sierra province
 Pacific Coast Ranges

References

External links
 United States National Park Service

Physiographic provinces
Regions of the Western United States
Pacific Coast Ranges